Pihla is a feminine given name of Finnish origin meaning “rowan tree.” It has been among the most popular names for girls in Finland in recent years.

People 
Pihla Keto-Huovinen (born 1974), Finnish politician currently serving in the Parliament of Finland.
Pihla Viitala (born 1982), Finnish actress.

Locations 
Pihla, Estonia, a village in Hiiu County in northwestern Estonia.
Pihla-Kaibaldi Nature Reserve on Hiiumaa in western Estonia.

Notes  

Given names
Finnish feminine given names